Pharmacichthys is a genus of prehistoric, deep-bodied fish that was described by Woodward in 1942.  Species of Pharmacichthys are known only from marine strata of Cenomanian Lebanon.

References

http://paleodb.org/cgi-bin/bridge.pl?action=checkTaxonInfo&taxon_no=35646&is_real_user=1

Acanthomorpha
Late Cretaceous fish
Late Cretaceous fish of Asia
Prehistoric ray-finned fish genera